The Journal of Crustacean Biology is a quarterly peer-reviewed scientific journal in the field of carcinology (crustacean research). It is published by The Crustacean Society and Oxford University Press (formerly by Brill Publishers and Allen Press), and since 2015 the editor-in-chief has been Peter Castro. According to the Journal Citation Reports, its 2016 impact factor is 1.064.

The journal has a mandatory publication fee of US$ 115 per printed page for non-members of the Society and an optional open access fee of $1830 minimum.

References

Further reading

External links 

Carcinology journals
Publications established in 1981
English-language journals
Quarterly journals
1981 establishments in the United States